Fuad bey Dibra (1886–1944) was an Albanian politician and nationalist who represented Albania at the Paris Peace Conference of 1919. He was a member of the High Regency Council.

Biography

Early life
Fuad Dibra was born in Dibër (present-day Debar) to a wealthy landowning family and was the son of Ismail Pasha. 

He attended a commercial school in Salonika (present-day Thessaloniki). As a man of substantial means, he largely financed the expense of the Albanian delegation at the Paris Peace Conference in 1919, which he also attended himself with Pandeli Evangjeli. He is said to have owned several restaurants in Paris. He had been of great assistance to the Albanian delegation at the Peace Conference of 1919-1920, but was misled into believing that Albania could be defended against the aggression of her Balkan neighbors.

Political period
In the 1920s, Dibra was in political opposition to Ahmet Zogu. He served as minister of national economy in the cabinet of Mustafa Kruja. In November 1942, he was a founding member of Balli Kombëtar. On 25 October 1943, the German occupation authorities, with whom he maintained good relations, persuaded him to serve as a member of the High Regency Council (Këshilli i Lartë i Regjencës) to represent the Muslim community. He was, however, unable to perform any particular functions because of ill health. He had been sent for treatment to Davos around March 1943. He died in Tirana in February 1944.

Personal life
Fuad Dibra was born in Dibra (present-day Debar) to a wealthy landowning family. He is a distant cousin of Nexhmije Hoxha, Enver Hoxha's wife. The families are quite resentful of each other due to their different ideologies. Nexhmije Hoxha claims that Dibra was very wealthy and had estates in Istanbul, Switzerland and France; and that he recklessly spent his fortune in Paris.

References

Albanian politicians
Members of the Parliament of Albania
Albanian anti-communists
Albanian people of World War II
Albanian military personnel
1944 deaths
People from Debar
Balli Kombëtar
1886 births
19th-century Albanian people
Albanians in North Macedonia
Albanians in the Ottoman Empire